This is a list of international and colonial world's fairs, as well as a list of national exhibitions, a comprehensive chronological list of world's fairs (with notable permanent buildings built).

1790s
 1791 – Prague, Bohemia – first industrial exhibition on the occasion of the coronation of Leopold II as king of Bohemia, took place in Clementinum, considerable sophistication of manufacturing methods. For this occasion, Wolfgang Amadeus Mozart wrote his final opera La clemenza di Tito. 
 1798 – Paris, France – L'Exposition des produits de l'industrie française, Paris, 1798. This was the first public industrial exposition in France although earlier in 1798 the Marquis d'Avèze had held a private exposition of handicrafts and manufactured goods at the Maison d'Orsay in the Rue de Varenne and it was this that suggested the idea of a public exposition to Nicolas François de Neufchâteau, Minister of the Interior for the French Republic.

1800s
 1801 – Paris, France – Second Exposition (1801). After the success of the exposition of 1798 a series of expositions for French manufacturing followed (1801, 1802, 1806, 1819, 1823, 1827, 1834, 1844 and 1849) until the first properly international (or universal) exposition in France in 1855.
 1802 – Paris, France – Third Exposition (1802)
 1806 – Paris, France – Fourth Exposition (1806)

1810s
 1819 – Paris, France – Fifth Exposition (1819)

1820s
 1823 – Paris, France – Sixth Exposition (1823)
 1827 – Paris, France – Seventh Exposition (1827)
 1829 – New York City, United States – American Institute Fair
 1829 – Turin, Piedmont-Sardinia – Prima Triennale Pubblica Esposizione dell’anno 1829. In Turin, a second 'triennale' followed in 1832 before other national agricultural, industrial, commercial, and applied arts expositions there in 1838, 1844, 1850 and 1858.

1830s
 1832 – Turin, Piedmont-Sardinia – Seconda Triennale Pubblica Esposizione dell’anno 1832.
 1834 – Paris, France – French Industrial Exposition of 1834
 1838 – Turin, Piedmont-Sardinia – Pubblica esposizione dell'anno 1838.
 1839 – Paris, France – Ninth Exposition (1839)

1840s
 1844 – Paris, France – French Industrial (Tenth) Exposition of 1844
 1844 – Turin, Piedmont-Sardinia – Quarta Esposizione d'Industria et di Belle Arti.
 1846 – Genoa, Piedmont-Sardinia – Esposizione dei Prodotti e delle Manufatture nazionali
 1849 – Birmingham, United Kingdom – Exhibition of Industrial Arts and Manufacturers
 1849 – London, United Kingdom – First Exhibition of British Manufacturers (1849)
 1849 – Paris, France – Eleventh Exposition (1849)

1850s
 1850 – Turin, Piedmont-Sardinia – Quinta Esposizione di Industria e di Belle Arti
 1851 – London, United Kingdom – The Great Exhibition of the Works of Industry of All Nations – The Crystal Palace (typically listed as the "first world's fair")
 1852 – Cork, Ireland – Irish Industrial Exhibition
 1853 – Naples, Two Sicilies – Solenne Pubblica Esposizione di Arti e Manifatture
 1853–1854 – New York City, United States – Exhibition of the Industry of All Nations
 1853 – Dublin, Ireland – Great Industrial Exhibition (1853)
 1854 – Genoa, Piedmont-Sardinia – Esposizione Industriale
 1854 – Munich, Bavaria – General German Industrial Exhibition (Allgemeine deutsche Industrie-Ausstellung)
 1854 – Melbourne, Victoria – Melbourne Exhibition (in conjunction with Exposition Universelle (1855))
 1855 – Paris, France – Exposition Universelle (1855)
1856 – Brussels, Belgium – International Exhibition 
 1857 – Manchester, United Kingdom – Art Treasures Exhibition at the Royal Botanical Gardens, Stretford
 1857 – Lausanne, Switzerland – Lausanne Exhibition
 1858 – Dijon, France – 
1858 – Philadelphia, Pennsylvania, United States – Philadelphia Technological Exhibition
 1858 – Turin, Piedmont-Sardinia – Sesta Esposizione Nazionale di Prodotti d'Industria

1860s
 1860 – Montreal, Quebec, Canada - Grand Exhibition of the Industrial Products of United Canada at the Crystal Palace (Montreal)
 1861 – Brisbane, Queensland – First Queensland Exhibition

 1861 – Melbourne, Victoria – Second Victorian Exhibition
 1861 – Metz, France – Exposition Universelle (1861)
 1861 – Amsterdam, Netherlands – Fisheries Exposition
 1862 – Geelong, Victoria - Exhibition of Art, Science and Industry
 1862 – London, United Kingdom – 1862 International Exhibition
 1864 – Bayonne, France – Franco-Spanish Exposition
 1865 – Cologne, Prussia – International Agricultural Exhibition
 1865 – Bergen, Norway – International Fisheries Exhibition
 1865 – Batavia, Dutch East Indies – Industrial and Agricultural Exhibition
 1865 – Dunedin, New Zealand – New Zealand Exhibition
 1865 – Dublin, United Kingdom – International Exhibition of Arts and Manufactures
 1865 – Freetown, Sierra Leone – Sierra Leone Exhibition
 1865 – Porto, Portugal – 1865 International Exhibition
 1866 – Ballarat, Victoria – National Industrial Exhibition
 1866 – Melbourne, Victoria – Intercolonial Exhibition of Australasia
 1866 – Boulogne-sur-Mer, France – International Fisheries Exposition
 1866 – Arcachon, France – International Exposition of Fish and Water Products
 1866 – Stockholm, Sweden – Scandinavian Industrial Exhibition
 1867 – Paris, France – Exposition Universelle (1867)
 1867 – The Hague, Netherlands – International Maritime Exhibition
 1867 – Aarhaus, Denmark – International Maritime Exhibition
 1867 – Vienna, Austria – International Maritime Exhibition
 1867 – Gothenburg, Sweden – International Maritime Exhibition
 1868 – Le Havre, France – International Maritime Exposition
 1869 – Amsterdam, Netherlands – International Exhibition of Domestic Economy

1870s
 1870 – Sydney, New South Wales – Intercolonial Exhibition (1870)
1871 – Córdoba, Argentina – Exposición Nacional
 1871 – London, United Kingdom – First Annual International Exhibition (1871)
 1871 – Naples, Italy – International Maritime Exposition
 1872 – Hamilton, Bermuda – Industrial and Loan Exhibition
 1872 – Copenhagen, Denmark – Second Scandinavian Exhibition of Arts and Industry
 1872 – London, United Kingdom – Second Annual International Exhibition (1872)
 1872 – Christchurch, New Zealand – New Zealand Interprovincial Exhibition
 1872 – Lima, Peru – Lima International Exhibition
 1872 – Lyon, France – Exposition Universelle et Internationale (1872)
 1872 – Kyoto, Japan – Exhibition of Arts and Manufactures (1872)
 1873 – London, United Kingdom – Third Annual International Exhibition (1873)
 1873 – Vienna, Austria – Weltausstellung 1873 Wien
 1873 – Sydney, New South Wales – Metropolitan Intercolonial Exhibition (1873)
 1874 – London, United Kingdom – Fourth Annual International Exhibition (1874)
 1874 – Dublin, United Kingdom – International Exhibition of Arts and Manufactures (1874)
 1874 – Rome, Italy – Esposizione internazionale (1874) (never held)
 1874 – Jamestown, Saint Helena – St. Helena Industrial Exhibition
1874 – Marseille, France – Exhibition of Modern Inventions and Discoveries
1874 – Philadelphia, Pennsylvania, United States – Franklin Institute Exhibition 
 1875 – Melbourne, Victoria – Victorian Intercolonial Exhibition
 1875 – Nizhni Novgorod, Russia – Nizhni Novgorod Fair (1875)
 1875 – Sydney, New South Wales – Intercolonial Exhibition (1875)
 1875 – Santiago, Chile – Chilean International Exhibition
 1876 – Brussels, Belgium – International Exposition of Hygiene and Life-saving Apparatus
 1876 – Helsinki, Finland – Finnish General Exhibition
 1876 – Adelaide, South Australia – Adelaide Industrial Exhibition
 1876 – Philadelphia, Pennsylvania, United States – Centennial Exposition
 1876 – Brisbane, Queensland – Intercolonial Exhibition (1876)
1876 – London, United Kingdom – London Loan Collection of Scientific Apparatus 
 1877 – Cape Town, Cape Colony – South African International Exhibition
 1877 – Tokyo, Japan – First National Industrial Exhibition (1877) (Ueno Park)
 1877 – Sydney, New South Wales – Sydney Metropolitan and Intercolonial Exhibition
 1877 – Adelaide, South Australia – Adelaide Industrial Exhibition
 1878 – Paris, France – Exposition Universelle (1878)
 1878 – Ballarat, Victoria – Australian Juvenile Industrial Exhibition (1878)
 1878 – London, United Kingdom – International Fisheries Exhibition 
 1879 – Bendigo, Victoria – Juvenile Industrial Exhibition
 1879 – Geelong, Victoria – Geelong Juvenile and Industrial Exhibition
 1879 – Sydney, New South Wales – Intercolonial Juvenile Industrial Exhibition
 1879 – Sydney, New South Wales – Sydney International Exhibition
 1879 – Melbourne, Victoria – Intercolonial Juvenile Industrial Exhibition (1879)
 1879 – Kilburn, United Kingdom – International Agricultural Exhibition

1880s
 1880 – Berlin, Germany – International Fisheries Exhibition
 1880 – Christchurch, New Zealand – Christchurch Industrial Exhibition
 1880 – Adelaide, South Australia – Industrial and Juvenile Exhibition
 1880 – Glasgow, United Kingdom – Glasgow Electrical Exhibition
 1880-1881 – Melbourne, Victoria – Melbourne International Exhibition (1880)
 1881 – Adelaide, South Australia – Adelaide Exhibition.
 1881 – Matanzas, Cuba – Exhibition of Matanzas
 1881 – Milwaukee, Wisconsin – Milwaukee Industrial Exposition
 1881 – Paris, France – International Exposition of Electricity, Paris
 1881 – Dunedin, New Zealand – Dunedin Industrial Exhibition
 1881 – Atlanta, Georgia, United States – International Cotton Exposition
 1881 – Budapest, Austria-Hungary – Országos Nőipari Kiállitás
 1881 – London, United Kingdom – International Medical and Sanitary Exhibition
 1881 – Tokyo, Japan – Second National Industrial Exhibition
 1881-1882 – Perth, Western Australia – Perth International Exhibition
 1882 – Lille, France – International Exposition of Industrial Art
 1882 – Munich, Germany – International Electrical Exposition
 1882 – Christchurch, New Zealand – New Zealand International Exhibition
 1882 – London, United Kingdom – Crystal Palace Electric Exhibition
 1882 – Edinburgh, United Kingdom – International Fisheries Exhibition
 1882 – Bordeaux, France – Exposition internationale des vins
 1882 – Buenos Aires, Argentina – South American Continental Exhibition (Exposición Continental Sud-Americana)
 1883 – London, United Kingdom – International Electric Exhibition
 1883 – Vienna, Austria-Hungary – International Electrical Exposition
 1883 – Cork, United Kingdom – Cork Industrial Exhibition
 1883 – Amsterdam, Netherlands – International Colonial and Export Exhibition
 1883 – Calcutta, India – Calcutta International Exhibition
 1883 – Marseilles, France – International Maritime Exposition
 1883 – Christchurch, New Zealand – All Colonial Exhibition
 1883 – Madrid, Spain – Exposition of Mining and Metallurgy
 1883 – South Kensington, United Kingdom – International Fisheries Exhibition
 1883 – Parramatta, New South Wales – Intercolonial Juvenile Industrial Exhibition
 1883 – Hobart, Tasmania – Tasmanian Juvenile and Industrial Exhibition
 1883 – Launceston, Tasmania – Art and Industrial Exhibition
 1883 – Louisville, Kentucky, United States – Southern Exposition
 1883 – New York City, United States – World's Fair (1883) (never held)
 1883 – Caracas, Venezuela – National Exposition of Venezuela
 1883–1884 – Boston, Massachusetts, United States – The American Exhibition of the Products, Arts and Manufactures of Foreign Nations
 1884 – Nice, France – International Exposition of Nice
 1884 – Amsterdam, Netherlands – International Agricultural Exhibition
 1884 – London, United Kingdom – London International Universal Exhibition
 1884 – South Kensington, United Kingdom – International Health and Education Exhibition
 1884 – Cape Town, Cape Colony – South African Industrial Exhibition
 1884 – Durban, South Africa – Natal Agricultural, Horticultural, Industrial and Art Exhibition
 1884 – New Orleans, Louisiana, United States – World Cotton Centennial
 1884 – Melbourne, Victoria – Victorian International Exhibition 1884 of Wine, Fruit, Grain & other products of the soil of Australasia with machinery, plant and tools employed
 1884 – Edinburgh, United Kingdom – First International Forestry Exhibition
 1884 – Turin, Italy – Esposizione Generale Italiana
 1884 – Adelaide, South Australia – Grand Industrial Exhibition
 1885 – Melbourne, Victoria – Victorians' Jubilee Exhibition (1885) (Jubilee of Victoria Exhibition)
 1885 – Port Elizabeth, Cape Colony (now South Africa) – South African Exhibition
 1885 – Antwerp, Belgium – Exposition Universelle d'Anvers (1885)
 1885 – Nuremberg, Germany – International Exposition of Metals and Metallurgy
 1885 – Budapest, Hungary – Hungarian National Exhibition
 1885 – Wellington, New Zealand – New Zealand Industrial Exhibition
 1885 – Zaragoza, Spain – Aragonese Exposition
 1885 – London, United Kingdom – International Inventions Exhibition
 1886 – London, United Kingdom – Colonial and Indian Exhibition (1886)
 1886 – Edinburgh, United Kingdom – International Exhibition of Industry, Science and Art
 1886 – Liverpool, United Kingdom – International Exhibition of Navigation, Commerce and Industry (1886)
 1886 – Bendigo, Victoria – Juvenile and Industrial Exhibition
 1886 – Launceston, Tasmania – Launceston Industrial Exhibition
 1886 – Perth, Western Australia – West Australian Exhibition
 1887 – Le Havre, France – International Maritime Exposition
 1887 – Atlanta, United States – Piedmont Exposition
 1887 – Geelong, Victoria – Geelong Jubilee Juvenile and Industrial Exhibition (1887)
 1887 – Manchester, United Kingdom – Royal Jubilee Exhibition
 1887 – London, United Kingdom – American Exhibition
 1887 – Newcastle, United Kingdom – Royal Mining Engineering Jubilee Exhibition
 1887 – Rome, Italy – Esposizione mondiale (1887)
 1887 – Madrid, Spain – Exposición General de las Islas Filipinas
 1887–1888 – Adelaide, South Australia – Adelaide Jubilee International Exhibition (1887)
 1888 – Glasgow, United Kingdom – International Exhibition (1888)
 1888 – Brussels, Belgium – Grand Concours International des Sciences et de l'Industrie (1888)
 1888 – Barcelona, Spain – Exposición Universal de Barcelona (1888)
 1888 – Cincinnati, Ohio – Cincinnati Centennial Exposition (1888)
 1888 – Lisbon, Portugal – Exposição Industrial Portugueza (1888)
 1888 – Copenhagen, Denmark – The Nordic Exhibition of 1888 (Nordiske Industri-Landbrugs og Kunstudstilling)
 1888–1889 – Melbourne, Victoria – Melbourne Centennial Exhibition
 1888–1889 – Melbourne, Victoria – Victorian Juvenile Industrial Exhibition (1888)
 1889 – Paris, France – Exposition Universelle (1889) – Eiffel Tower
 1889 – Dunedin, New Zealand – New Zealand and South Seas Exhibition (1889)
 1889 – Buffalo, New York, United States – International Industrial Fair (1889)

1890s
 1890 – Buenos Aires, Argentina – Agricultural Exhibition
 1890 – Vienna, Austria-Hungary – Agricultural and Forestry Exposition
 1890 – Bremen, Germany – Nord-West-Deutsche Gewerbe und Industrie-Ausstellung
 1890 – London, United Kingdom – International Exhibition of Mining and Metallurgy
 1890 – Edinburgh, United Kingdom – International Exhibition of Science, Art & Industry
 1890 – Ballarat, Victoria - Australian Juvenile Industrial Exhibition
 1891 – Moscow, Russia – Exposition française
 1891 – Frankfurt, Germany – International Electrotechnical Exhibition
 1891 – Kingston, Jamaica – International Exhibition (1891)
 1891 – Prague, Austria-Hungary – General Land Centennial Exhibition (1891) at the Prague Exhibition Grounds 
 1891 – Adelaide, South Australia – Industrial Exhibition of South Australian Industries, Products and Manufactures
 1891 – Port of Spain – Trinidad and Tobago Exhibition
 1891–1892 – Launceston, Tasmania – Tasmanian International Exhibition (1891)
 1892 – Grenoble, France – International Alpine Exposition of Grenoble
 1892 – Genoa, Italy – Esposizione Italo-Americana (1892)
 1892 – Washington, D.C., United States – Exposition of the Three Americas (1892) (never held)
 1892 – London, United Kingdom – Crystal Palace Electrical Exhibition
 1892 – Kimberley, Cape of Good Hope – South African and International Exhibition
 1892–1893 – Madrid, Spain – Historical American Exposition
 1893 – Chicago, Illinois, United States – World's Columbian Exposition – Palace of Fine Arts and the World's Congress Auxiliary Building
 1893 – New York City, United States – World's Fair Prize Winners' Exposition (1893)
 1894 – San Francisco, California, United States – California Midwinter International Exposition of 1894
 1894 – Antwerp, Belgium – Exposition Internationale d'Anvers (1894)
 1894 – Santiago, Chile – International Mining and Metallurgical Exposition
 1894 – Lyons, France – Exposition internationale et coloniale
 1894 – Manchester, United Kingdom – British and Colonial Exhibition
 1894 – Porto, Portugal – Exposição Insular e Colonial Portugueza (1894)
 1894 – Fremantle, Western Australia – Fremantle Industrial Exhibition
 1895 – Adelaide, South Australia – Exhibition of Art and Industry
 1895 – Hobart, Tasmania – Tasmanian International Exhibition (1895)
 1895 – Ballarat, Victoria – Australian Industrial Exhibition (1895)
 1895 – Bordeaux, France – 
 1895 – Kyoto, Japan – National Japanese Exhibition
 1895 – Christchurch, New Zealand – Art and Industrial Exhibition
 1895 – Atlanta, Georgia, United States – Cotton States and International Exposition (1895) (Atlanta Exposition)
 1895 – Montevideo, Uruguay - National Agricultural Exhibition
 1896 – Rouen, France – National and Colonial Exposition
 1896 – Kiel, Germany – International Shipping and Fishery Exposition
 1896 – Budapest, Austria-Hungary – Hungarian Millenary Exhibition
 1896 – Wellington, New Zealand – Wellington Industrial Exhibition
 1896 – Nizhny Novgorod, Russia – Pan Russian Exhibition
 1896 – Malmö, Sweden – Nordic Industrial and Handicraft Exhibition
 1896 – Berlin, Germany – Great Industrial Exposition of Berlin
 1896 – Mexico City, Mexico – International Exposition (1896) (never held)
 1896 – Cardiff, United Kingdom – Cardiff Fine Arts, Industrial, and Maritime Exhibition
 1897 – Brussels, Belgium – Exposition Internationale de Bruxelles (1897)
 1897 – Arcachon, France – Arcachon International Exposition
 1897 – Guatemala City, Guatemala – Exposición Centroamericana
 1897 – London, United Kingdom – Imperial Victorian Exhibition
 1897 – Brisbane, Queensland – Queensland International Exhibition
 1897 – Chicago, Illinois, United States – Irish Fair (1897)
 1897 – Nashville, Tennessee, United States – Tennessee Centennial and International Exposition
 1897 – Stockholm, Sweden – General Art and Industrial Exposition of Stockholm
 1897 – Kiev, Russian Empire – Agricultural Exhibition
 1898 – Buenos Aires, Argentina – National Exhibition
 1898 – Jerusalem, Ottoman Empire – Universal Scientific and Philanthropic Exposition (1898)
 1898 – Auckland, New Zealand – Auckland Industrial and Mining Exhibition
 1898 – Dunedin, New Zealand – Otago Jubilee Industrial Exhibition (1898)
 1898 – Omaha, Nebraska, United States – Trans-Mississippi Exposition
 1898 – Bergen, Norway – International Fisheries Exposition (1898)
 1898 – Munich, Germany – Kraft – und Arbeitsmaschinen-Ausstellung (1898)
 1898 – San Francisco, California, United States – California's Golden Jubilee (1898)
 1898 – Turin, Italy – Esposizione Generale Italiana
 1898 – Vienna, Austria-Hungary – Jubiläums-Ausstellung
 1898 – Launceston, Tasmania – Tasmanian Juvenile Industrial Exhibition
 1898 – Grahamstown, South Africa – Industrial and Arts Exhibition
 1899 – Coolgardie, Western Australia – Western Australian International Mining and Industrial Exhibition
 1899 – Como, Italy – Como Electrical Exhibition
 1899 – Omaha, Nebraska, United States – Greater America Exposition
 1899 – Philadelphia, Pennsylvania, United States – National Export Exposition
 1899 – London, United Kingdom – Greater Britain Exhibition

1900s
 1900 – Paris, France – Exposition Universelle (1900) – Le Grand Palais
 1900 – Adelaide, South Australia – Century Exhibition of Arts and Industries (1900)
 1900 – Christchurch, New Zealand – Canterbury Jubilee Industrial Exhibition
 1901 – Bendigo, Australia – Victorian Gold Jubilee Exhibition
 1901 – Buffalo, New York, United States – Pan-American Exposition
 1901 – Glasgow, United Kingdom – Glasgow International Exhibition (1901)
 1901 – Vienna, Austria-Hungary – Bosnische Weihnachts-Ausstellung (1901)
 1901 – Charleston, South Carolina, United States – South Carolina Inter-State and West Indian Exposition
 1902 – Vienna, Austria-Hungary – International Fishery Exposition
 1902 – Turin, Italy – Esposizione Internazionale d'Arte Decorativa Moderna
 1902 – Hanoi, French Indochina – Hanoi exhibition (Indo China Exposition Française et Internationale)
 1902 – Lille, France – International Exposition of Lille
 1902 – Cork, United Kingdom – Cork International Exhibition
 1902 – Wolverhampton, United Kingdom – Wolverhampton Art and Industrial Exhibition
 1902 – St. Petersburg, Russia – International Fisheries Exhibition
 1902 – New York City, United States – United States, Colonial and International Exposition (1902) (never held)
 1902 – Toledo, Ohio, United States – Ohio Centennial and Northwest Territory Exposition (1902) – (never held)
 1903 – Melbourne, Australia – Australian Federal International Exhibition
 1903 – Osaka, Japan – Fifth National Industrial Exhibition
 1904 – St. Louis, Missouri, United States – Louisiana Purchase Exposition (also called Louisiana Purchase International Exposition and Olympic Games ): 1904 Summer Olympics
 1904 – Cape Town, South Africa – Cape Town Industrial Exhibition
 1905 – Portland, Oregon, United States – Lewis and Clark Centennial Exposition
 1905 – Liège, Belgium – Exposition universelle et internationale de Liège (1905)
 1905 – London, United Kingdom – Naval, Shipping and Fisheries Exhibition
 1905 – New York City, United States – Irish Industrial Exposition (1905)
 1906 – Vienna, Austria-Hungary – Hygiene Exhibition
 1906 – Milan, Italy – Esposizione Internazionale del Sempione
 1906 – London, United Kingdom – Imperial Austrian Exhibition
 1906 – Marseille, France – Exposition coloniale (1906)
 1906 – Bucharest, Romania – Romanian General Exposition
 1906 – Tourcoing, France – International Exposition of Textile Industries
 1906–1907 – Christchurch, New Zealand – International Exhibition (1906)
 1907 – Bordeaux, France – 
 1907 – Tokyo, Japan – Tokyo Industrial Exhibition
 1907 – Bergen, Norway – Nordic Marine Motor Exhibition
 1907 – Dublin, United Kingdom – Irish International Exhibition
 1907 – Hampton Roads, Virginia, United States – Jamestown Exposition
 1907 – Chicago, Illinois, United States – World's Pure Food Exposition (1907)
 1907 – Mannheim, Germany – Internationale Kunst-Ausstellung (1907)
 1908 – Marseille, France – Exposition of Electricity
 1908 – Trondheim, Norway – Scandinavian Fisheries Exhibition
 1908 – Zaragoza, Spain – Hispano-French Exposition of 1908
 1908 – London, United Kingdom – Franco-British Exhibition (1908)
 1908 – Edinburgh, United Kingdom – Scottish National Exhibition
 1908 – New York City, United States – International Mining Exposition (1908)
 1908 – Rio de Janeiro, Brazil – Exhibition of the centenary of the opening of the Ports of Brazil
 1908 – Marseille, France – Exposition International de l'Electricite
 1909 – London, United Kingdom – Imperial International Exhibition
 1909 – Nancy, France – Exposition Internationale de l'Est de la France
 1909 – Seattle, Washington, United States – Alaska-Yukon-Pacific Exposition
 1909 – New York City, United States – Hudson-Fulton Celebration
 1909 – San Francisco, California, United States – Portolá Festival (1909)
 1909 – Quito, Ecuador – National Ecuadorian Exposition

1910s
 1910 – Vienna, Austria-Hungary – International Hunting Exposition
 1910 – Santiago, Chile – International Agricultural and Industrial Exposition
 1910 – Bogotá, Colombia – Exposición del Centenario de la independencia (1910)
 1910 – Nanking, China – Nanyang Industrial Exposition
 1910 – Brussels, Belgium – Brussels International 1910
 1910 – Buenos Aires, Argentina – Exposición Internacional del Centenario
 1910 – Nagoya, Japan – Nagoya Industrial Exhibition
 1910 – London, United Kingdom – Japan–British Exhibition
 1910 – San Francisco, California, United States – Admission Day Festival (1910) September 8, 9, 10
 1910 – Vienna, Austria-Hungary – Internationale Jagd-Ausstellung (1910)
 1911 – Charleroi, Belgium – Charleroi Exposition
 1911 – Havana, Cuba – Cuban National Exposition
 1911 – Roubaix, France – International Exposition of Northern France
 1911 – Dresden, Germany – International Hygiene Exhibition
 1911 – London, United Kingdom – Coronation Exhibition (1911)
 1911 – London, United Kingdom – Festival of Empire
 1911 – Rome, Italy – Esposizione internazionale d'arte (1911)
 1911 – Wellington, New Zealand – Coronation Industrial Exhibition
 1911 – Turin, Italy – Turin International
 1911 – Omsk, Russia – Western Siberian Exhibition
 1911 – Glasgow, United Kingdom – Scottish Exhibition of National History, Art and Industry
 1911 – New York City, United States – International Mercantile Exposition (1911)
 1912 – Manila, Philippines – Philippine Exposition (1912)
 1912 – London, United Kingdom – Latin-British Exhibition
 1912, 1917 – Tokyo, Japan – Grand Exhibition of Japan (planned for 1912, postponed to 1917 and then never held)
 1913 – Melbourne, Australia - Great All-Australian Exhibition
 1913 – Leipzig, Germany – International Building Trades Exposition
 1913 – Auckland, New Zealand – Auckland Exhibition
 1913 – Ghent, Belgium – Exposition universelle et internationale (1913)
 1913 – Amsterdam, Netherlands – Tentoonstelling De Vrouw 1813–1913
 1913 – Kiev, Russian Empire – All Russian Exhibition
 1913 – Knoxville, Tennessee, United States – National Conservation Exposition
 1914 – London, United Kingdom – Anglo-American Exhibition
 1914 – Malmö, Sweden – Baltic Exhibition
 1914 – Boulogne-sur-Mer, France – International Exposition of Sea Fishery Industries (1914)
 1914 – Lyon, France – Exposition internationale urbaine de Lyon
 1914 – Tokyo, Japan – Tokyo Taisho Exposition
 1914 – Cologne, Germany – Werkbund Exhibition (1914)
 1914 – Bristol, United Kingdom – International Exhibition (1914)
 1914 – Nottingham, United Kingdom – Universal Exhibition (1914) (work begun on site 1913 but never held)
 1914 – Semarang, Dutch East Indies – Colonial Exhibition of Semarang (Colonial Exposition)
 1914 – Christiania, Norway – 1914 Jubilee Exhibition (Norges Jubilæumsutstilling)
 1914 – Baltimore, United States – National Star-Spangled Banner Centennial Celebration
 1914 – Genoa, Italy – International exhibition of marine and maritime hygiene 
 1915 – Casablanca, Morocco – Casablanca Fair of 1915
 1915 – San Francisco, California, United States – Panama–Pacific International Exposition Palace of Fine Arts
 1915 – Panama City, Panama – Exposición Nacional de Panama (1915)
 1915 – Richmond, United States – Negro Historical and Industrial Exposition (1915)
 1915 – Chicago, United States – Lincoln Jubilee and Exposition (1915)
 1915–1916 – San Diego, California, United States – Panama–California Exposition
 1916 – Wellington, New Zealand – British Commercial and Industrial Exhibition
 1918 – New York City, United States – Bronx International Exposition of Science, Arts and Industries
 1918 – Los Angeles, United States – California Liberty Fair (1918)

1920s
 1920 – Adelaide, Australia – All-Australian Peace Exhibition
 1920 – Shanghai, China – American-Chinese Exposition
 1921 – Riga, Latvia – International Exhibition of Agriculture and Industry
 1921 – Wellington, New Zealand – Exhibition of New Zealand Industries
 1921 – London, United Kingdom – International Exhibition of Rubber and Other Tropical Products (1921)
 1922 – Marseille, France – Exposition nationale coloniale (1922)
 1922 – Tokyo, Japan – Peace Exhibition (1922)
 1922 – Christchurch, New Zealand – Exhibition of New Zealand Industries
 1922–1923 – Rio de Janeiro, Brazil – Exposição do Centenario do Brasil (1922)
 1923 – Auckland, New Zealand – Dominion Industrial Exhibition
 1923 – Los Angeles, United States – American Historical Review and Motion Picture Exposition (1923)
 1923 – Calcutta, India – Calcutta Exhibition (1923) preparatory to British Empire Exhibition
 1923 – Moscow, Soviet Union – All-Russian Agricultural and Domestic Industries Exhibition
 1923 – Gothenburg, Sweden – Gothenburg Exhibition (1923) (Jubileumsutställningens i Göteborg) (Liseberg)
 1923–1924 – Hokitika, New Zealand – British and Intercolonial Exhibition
 1924 – Wembley, London, United Kingdom – British Empire Exhibition
 1924 – New York City, United States – French Exposition (1924)
 1924–1925 Buenos Aires, Argentina – Industrial Exposition
 1925 – Adelaide, Australia – All-Australian Exhibition
 1925 – Wellington, New Zealand – Dominion Industrial Exhibition
 1925 – San Francisco, California, United States – California's Diamond Jubilee (1925)
 1925 – Paris, France – International Exhibition of Modern Decorative and Industrial Arts
 1925–1926 – Dunedin, New Zealand – New Zealand and South Seas International Exhibition
 1926 – Philadelphia, Pennsylvania, United States – Sesquicentennial Exposition
 1926 – Berlin, Germany – Internationale Polizeiausstellung (1926)
 1927 – Lyon, France – Foire internationale (1925)
 1927 – Stuttgart, Germany – Werkbund Exhibition
 1928 – Cologne, Germany – International Press Exhibition
 1928 – Long Beach, United States – Pacific Southwest Exposition (1928)
 1929 – Newcastle upon Tyne, United Kingdom – North East Coast Exhibition
 1929 – Hangzhou, China – Westlake Exposition
 1929–1930 – Seville, Spain – Ibero-American Exposition of 1929
 1929–1930 – Barcelona, Spain, – 1929 Barcelona International Exposition

1930s
 1930 – Adelaide, Australia – All-Australian Exhibition
 1930 – Antwerp, Belgium – Exposition internationale coloniale, maritime et d'art flamand
 1930 – Liège, Belgium – Exposition internationale de la grande industrie, sciences et applications, art wallon ancien
 1930 – Oran, Algeria – Oran Exposition
 1930 – Dresden, Germany – International Hygiene Exposition
 1930 – Stockholm, Sweden – Stockholm Exhibition (1930) (Utställningen av konstindustri, konsthandverk och hemslöjd)
 1930 – Trondheim, Norway – Trøndelag Exhibition
 1931 – Paris, France – Paris Colonial Exposition
 1931 – Berlin, Germany – International Building Exposition
 1932 – Tel Aviv, Palestine – Levant Fair
 1933 – Tokyo, Japan – Women's and Children International Exhibition
 1933–1934 – Buenos Aires, Argentina – Industrial Exposition
 1933–1934 – Chicago, Illinois, United States – Century of Progress International Exposition
 1934 – Melbourne, Australia – Centenary All Australian Exhibition
 1934 – Porto, Portugal – Portuguese colonial exhibition
 1934 – Tel Aviv, Palestine – Levant Fair
 1935 – Yokohama, Japan – Grand Yokohama Exposition
 1935 – Moscow, Soviet Union – All-Union Agricultural Exhibition (VSKhV)
 1935 – Brussels, Belgium – Brussels International Exposition (1935)
 1935 – Porto Alegre, Brazil – Farroupilha Revolution centennial fair
 1935 – Taipei. Taiwan – The Taiwan Exposition: In Commemoration of the First Forty Years of Colonial Rule
 1935–1936 – San Diego, California United States – California Pacific International Exposition
 1936 – Adelaide, Australia – Adelaide Centennial Exhibition
 1936 – Stockholm, Sweden ILIS 1936
 1936 – Tel Aviv, Palestine – Levant Fair
 1936 – Cleveland, United States – Great Lakes Exposition
 1936 – Dallas, Texas, United States – Texas Centennial Exposition
 1936–1937 – Johannesburg, South Africa – Empire Exhibition, South Africa
 1937 – Cleveland, Ohio, United States – Great Lakes Exposition
 1937 – Dallas, United States – Greater Texas & Pan-American Exposition
 1937 – Berlin, Germany – International Hunting Exposition
 1937 – Düsseldorf, Germany – Reichsausstellung Schaffendes Volk
 1937 – Miami, United States – Pan American Fair (1937)
 1937 – Paris, France – Exposition Internationale des Arts et Techniques dans la Vie Moderne (1937)
 1937 – Nagoya, Japan – Nagoya Pan-Pacific Peace Exposition
 1938 – Berlin, Germany – International Handiworks Exposition
 1938 – Glasgow, United Kingdom – Empire Exhibition, Scotland 1938
 1938 – Helsinki, Finland Second International Aeronautic Exhibition
 1939 – Wellington, New Zealand – New Zealand Centennial Exhibition
 1939 – Liège, Belgium – Exposition internationale de l'eau (1939)
 1939 – Zürich, Switzerland – Schweizerische Landesausstellung
 1939 – Moscow, Soviet Union – All-Union Agricultural Exhibition
 1939–1940 – New York City, United States – 1939 New York World's Fair (exhibits included The World of Tomorrow, Futurama, Trylon and Perisphere)
 1939–1940 – San Francisco, California, United States – Golden Gate International Exposition

1940s
 1940 – Lisbon, Portugal – Portuguese World Exhibition
 1940 – Chicago, Illinois, United States – American Negro Exposition 
 1940 – Los Angeles, California, United States – Pacific Mercado (1940) (never held)
 1940 – Naples, Italy – Mostra Triennale delle Terre Italiane d’Oltremare (Triennial Exhibition of Overseas Italian Territories)
 1940 – Tokyo, Japan – Grand International Exposition of Japan (1940) (never held)
 1942 – Los Angeles, California, United States – Cabrillo Fair (1942) (never held)
 1942 – Rome, Italy – Esposizione universale (1942) (E42) (never held)
 1943 – Stockholm, Sweden – Norwegian Exhibition
 1947 – Paris, France – International Exhibition on Urbanism and Housing
 1948 – Brussels, Belgium – Foire coloniale (1948)
 1949 – Stockholm, Sweden – Universal Sport Exhibition
 1949 – Lyon, France – International Exhibition on Urbanism and Housing
 1949–1950 – Port-au-Prince, Haiti – Exposition internationale du bicentenaire de Port-au-Prince

1950s
 1951 – Lille, France – The International Textile Exhibition
 1951 – London, United Kingdom – Festival of Britain – Skylon
 1952 – Colombo, Ceylon – Colombo Exhibition
 1953 – St Louis, Missouri, United States – intended to commemorate the Louisiana Purchase's sesquicentennial, but never held
 1953 – Manila, Philippines – the Philippines International Fair of 1953, 1 February – 30 April 1953, to show off the recovery of the Philippines from WW2 and as the first democracy in the Far East
 1953 – Jerusalem, Israel – International Exhibition and Fair Jerusalem Israel Conquest of the desert
 1953 – Rome, Italy – Agricultural Exposition of Rome EA 53 Rome
 1954 – Naples, Italy – Oltremare Exhibition – Campi Flegrei
 1954 – Bogota, Colombia – First International Industry and Commerce Fair of Bogota
 1954–1955 – São Paulo, Brazil – Fourth Centenary Exhibition
 1955 – Turin, Italy – International Expo of Sport Turin 1955
 1955 – Helsingborg, Sweden Helsingborg Exhibition 1955
 1955 – Ciudad Trujillo (Santo Domingo), Dominican Republic – Feria de la Paz y Confraternidad del Mundo Libre
 1956 – Beit Dagan, Israel – Exhibition of citriculture
 1957 – Berlin International Building Exposition
 1958 – Brussels, Belgium – Expo '58 (Exposition Universelle et Internationale de Bruxelles) – Atomium
 1959 – New Delhi, India – World Agricultural Fair
 1959 – Moscow, Soviet Union – VDNKh

1960s
 1960 – cancelled (planned site: Caracas, Venezuela)
 1961 – Turin, Italy – Exposition International du Travail Expo 61
 1962 – Seattle, United States – Century 21 Exposition – Space Needle
 1964 – Lausanne, Switzerland – Expo 64 – Schweizerische Landesausstellung
 1964–1965 – New York City, United States – 1964/1965 New York World's Fair (note: not sanctioned by the Bureau International des Expositions) – Unisphere
 1965 – Munich, Germany – International Exhibition of Transport and Communication
 1967 – Montreal, Quebec, Canada – Expo 67, (Universal and International Exhibition of 1967)
 1968 – San Antonio, Texas, United States – HemisFair '68 – Tower of the Americas

1970s
 1970 – Osaka, Japan – Expo '70 (Japan World Exposition)
 1971 – Budapest, Hungary – Expo 71 (Exhibition World of Hunting)
 1974 – Spokane, Washington, United States – Expo '74 (International Exposition on the Environment) – Riverfront Park
 1975 – Okinawa, Japan – Expo '75 (International Ocean Exposition)

1980s
 1981 – Plovdiv, Bulgaria – Expo 81
 1982 – Knoxville, Tennessee, United States – 1982 World's Fair (International Energy Exposition) – Sunsphere
 1984 – New Orleans, Louisiana, United States – 1984 Louisiana World Exposition [a.k.a., 1984 World's Fair] (Theme: "Fresh Water As A Source of Life")
 1984 – Liverpool, United Kingdom International Garden Festival Liverpool'84
 1985 – Plovdiv, Bulgaria  – Expo 85
 1985 – Tsukuba, Japan – Expo 85
 1986 – Vancouver, British Columbia, Canada – Expo 86 (1986 World Exposition)
 to date, the last World's Fair to be held in North America
 1988 – Brisbane, Australia – Expo '88 (World Expo '88) – Skyneedle

1990s
 1991 – Plovdiv, Bulgaria – Second World Exhibition of inventions of the young
 1992 – three expositions (1 was cancelled) celebrating 500 years since Christopher Columbus reached the Americas
 Seville, Spain – Seville Expo '92 Universal Exposition, port where Columbus started his voyage
 Genoa, Italy – Genoa Expo '92 Specialized Exposition, city where Columbus was born
 Chicago, United States (Cancelled) – meant to generically represent the Americas-side of Columbus' voyage
 1993 – Daejeon (Taejon), South Korea – Expo '93
 1995 – Vienna, Austria which was proposed to be a joint exhibition with Budapest. This was never held
 1996 – cancelled (planned site: Budapest, Hungary)
 1998 – Lisbon, Portugal – Expo '98
 1999 – Kunming, China – World Horticultural Exposition

2000s
 2000 – Hanover, Germany – Expo 2000
 2000 – Greenwich, London, United Kingdom – Millennium Dome
 2002 – cancelled (planned site: Metro Manila, Philippines)
 2002 – cancelled (planned site: Gold Coast, Queensland, Australia)
 2002 – Biel, Murten, Neuchâtel and Yverdon-les-Bains in Switzerland – Expo.02
 2004 – cancelled (planned site: Seine-Saint-Denis, France)
 2004 – Barcelona, Spain – Universal Forum of World Cultures
 2005 – Aichi, Japan – Expo 2005
 2008 – Zaragoza, Spain – Expo 2008

2010s
 2010 – Shanghai, China – Expo 2010
 2012 – Yeosu, South Korea – Expo 2012
 2015 – Milan, Italy – Expo 2015
 2017 – Astana, Kazakhstan – Expo 2017

2020s
 2021–2022 – Dubai, United Arab Emirates — Expo 2020
 2023 – Buenos Aires, Argentina — Expo 2023 – cancelled
 2025 – Osaka, Japan — Expo 2025

Future bids and candidate cities

Expo 2027 or Expo 2028

Five countries have submitted bids to the BIE for a three-month specialized exposition take place in either 2027 or 2028.:  the United States of America (in Minnesota), Thailand (in Phuket), Serbia (in Belgrade), Spain (in Malaga), and Argentina (in San Carlos de Bariloche).

Expo 2030

Four countries have submitted bids for the six-month world expo to be held in 2030.

 2030 – Russia had submitted Moscow for the Expo 2030 event to be held between 27 April and 27 October 2030.
 2030 – Ukraine has submitted Odesa.
 2030 – Italy has submitted Rome.
 2030 – South Korea has submitted Busan. The exposition would run from May 1 to October 31 with a theme of “Transforming Our World, Navigating Toward a Better Future.”
 2030 – Saudi Arabia has submitted Riyadh for the Expo 2030

See also
 List of tourist attractions worldwide
 List of world expositions

References

External links
 ExpoMuseum – The World's Fair Museum
 ExpoBids – Proposed and Active Bids for Future World's Fairs

and
World's fairs
World's fairs
World's
Exhibitions